Richard Blechynden was a British merchant who is credited with popularizing iced tea. Blechynden sold iced tea at the 1904 World's Fair, after which the drink attained nationwide recognition.

Biography 
Blechyden was a merchant and tea plantation owner in turn of the century America who made money by marketing tea beverages. One type of beverage, iced tea, had long been customary in the American South but was not widely known in other parts of the United States. The drink gradually grew in popularity in the late 19th-century, with one of the first recipes for iced tea being published in Virginia in 1878.

In 1904, Blechyden reportedly decided that a cool tea drink would be more profitable than hot tea during that year's World's Fair. The fair was held in St. Louis that year during a particularly hot period, driving up sales of Blechyden's iced tea. The beverage sold so well that it gain national popularity after the event. Another telling of Blechdyen's story holds that his marketing of iced tea was an act of "desperation". In this telling of iced tea's origin, Blechdyn had originally been selling hot tea, but found that fairgoers weren't interested in near-boiling tea in the intense St. Louis heat. It is unknown if he had previously heard of iced tea, but it is certain that his decision to begin selling chilled tea was widely popular at the fair and had a lasting impact.

References 

Year of birth missing
Year of death missing
American merchants